Barmby on the Marsh is a village and civil parish in the East Riding of Yorkshire, England. It lies on the east bank of the River Ouse (and facing North Yorkshire over it), near its confluence with the River Derwent.

According to the 2011 UK census, Barmby on the Marsh parish had a population of 372, an increase on the 2001 UK census figure of 345.

The parish church of St Helen is a Grade II listed building, while the village has one pub, The Kings Head (the Sloop Inn closed some decades ago).  Neighbouring Asselby also has a pub, The Black Swan.

Unusually, Barmby is situated at the end of a long dead end road, on which also lies the village of Asselby.

Barmby was served by Barmby railway station on the Hull and Barnsley Railway between 1885 and 1955.

References

External links

Villages in the East Riding of Yorkshire
Civil parishes in the East Riding of Yorkshire